Tetrahydroisoquinoline (TIQ or THIQ) is an organic compound with the chemical formula C9H11N. Classified as a secondary amine, it is derived from isoquinoline by hydrogenation.  It is a colorless viscous liquid that is miscible with most organic solvents.  The tetrahydroisoquinoline skeleton is encountered in a number of bioactive compounds and drugs.

Reactions
As a secondary amine, tetrahydroisoquinoline has weakly basic properties and forms salts with strong acids.  It can be dehydrogenated to give isoquinoline and hydrogenated to decahydroisoquinoline. Like other secondary amines, tetrahydroisoquinoline can be oxidized to the corresponding nitrone using hydrogen peroxide, catalyzed by selenium dioxide.

Toxicology
Tetrahydroisoquinoline derivatives may be formed in the body as metabolites of some drugs, and this was once thought to be involved in the development of alcoholism. This theory has now been discredited and is no longer generally accepted by the scientific community, but endogenous production of neurotoxic tetrahydroisoquinoline derivatives such as norsalsolinol continue to be investigated as possible causes for some conditions such as Parkinson's disease.

Tetrahydroisoquinolines
The tetrahydroisoquinoline skeleton is present in a number of drugs, such as tubocurarine, one of the quaternary ammonium muscle relaxants. Drugs based on 4-substituted tetrahydroisoquinolines include nomifensine and diclofensine.  They can be prepared by N-alkylation of benzyl amines with haloacetophenones. Naturally occurring tetrahydroisoquinolines include cherylline and latifine.

Esproquin, which shows hypotensive activity by virtue of its α-adrenergic blocking properties, is made from THIQ.

References